"Si Te Preguntan..." is a song by American singers Prince Royce and Nicky Jam and Puerto Rican singer Jay Wheeler. The song was released on June 23, 2022. The music video premiered on the same day as its audio release.

Charts

Weekly charts

Certifications

References

2022 songs
2022 singles
Prince Royce songs
Nicky Jam songs
Sony Music Latin singles
Spanish-language songs